Brinch is a surname. Notable people with the surname include:

Christian Brinch (1905–?), Norwegian civil servant
Gregers Brinch (born 1964), Danish composer
Jeppe Brinch (born 1995), Danish footballer 
Lorentz Brinch (1910–1953), Norwegian barrister, military officer, banker and politician
Sigurd Christian Brinch (1874–1956), Norwegian manager and politician